Metropolis of Pittsburgh may refer to:

 Byzantine Catholic Metropolis of Pittsburgh, an Eastern Catholic ecclesiastical jurisdiction
 Greek Orthodox Metropolis of Pittsburgh, an Eastern Orthodox ecclesiastical jurisdiction

See also
 Metropolis (disambiguation)
 Pittsburgh (disambiguation)